Yang Shou-chung or Yang Shouzhong, birth name Yang Zhenming, (1910–1985) was the eldest son of Yang Chengfu.

Biography 
Yang Shou-chung began training in his family's style of t'ai chi ch'uan (taijiquan) at age 8. By age 14 he had begun to work with his father as a teaching assistant and at age 19 he was already teaching government officials around China. In 1949 he fled to Hong Kong where he stayed for the remainder of his life teaching privately mostly out of his home on Lockhart Road on Hong Kong Island. He appointed three disciples: Ip Tai Tak (1st and Chief Disciple (Hong Kong), Gin Soon Chu (2nd Disciple, U.S.), Chu King Hung (3rd Disciple, Europe). Yang Shou-chung is survived by his three daughters: Tai Yee, Ma Lee and Yee Li who currently also reside in Hong Kong.

T'ai chi ch'uan lineage tree with Yang-style focus, click the "show" button below

External links 
Ip Tai Tak's (1st Disciple of Yang Shou-chung) disciple Bob Boyd
Gin Soon Tai Chi Chuan Federation, USA: Gin-Soon Chu, 2nd Disciple of Yang Shou-Chung
H. Won Tai Chi Institute: H. Won Gim, 2nd Disciple of Gin-Soon Chu 
Master Chu King Hung International Tai Chi Chuan Association 3rd Disciple's website
Exhaustive Yang family tree with info on Yang Shou-chung's descendants
Master Ding Academy Traditional Tai Chi Chuan (Master Ding is 1st Disciple of Ip Tai Tak

1910 births
1985 deaths
Chinese tai chi practitioners